Étienne Richaud (Étienne Antoine Guillaume Richaud), born on January 11, 1841, in Martigues (Bouches-du-Rhône, France) and died on May 31, 1889, in the Bay of Bengal, was the Principal private secretary of the Minister of Commerce Maurice Rouvier (Gambetta's Ministry), Governor of La Réunion, Governor General for Inde française in the Second French Colonial Empire under Third Republic.

Titles held

1841 births
1889 deaths
People from Martigues
Governors of French India
People of the French Third Republic